Alexander Mikhaylin (born 18 August 1979) is a Russian judoka. He is a silver medalist in heavyweight at the 2012 Olympics in London, as well as multiple world champion.

Achievements

References

External links

 
 
 
 
 
 Videos of Aleksandr Mikhailine on Judovision.org

1979 births
Living people
Russian male judoka
Judoka at the 2012 Summer Olympics
Olympic judoka of Russia
Olympic medalists in judo
World judo champions
Olympic silver medalists for Russia
Medalists at the 2012 Summer Olympics
Universiade medalists in judo
Universiade silver medalists for Russia